Labor of Love is the fifth studio album by the American country music artist Sammy Kershaw. It was released in 1997 (see 1997 in country music) on Mercury Records. It was his third album to achieve RIAA platinum certification and his highest-charting album on the Top Country Albums charts, where it peaked at #5.

In order of release, this album's singles were "Love of My Life", "Matches", "Honky Tonk America" and "One Day Left to Live", which respectively reached #2, #22, #31 and #35 on the Hot Country Songs charts. "Little Did I Know" was co-written by Dave Gibson (formerly of the Gibson/Miller Band) and Bill McCorvey, lead vocalist of Pirates of the Mississippi.

Track listing

Personnel
As listed in liner notes.
Eddie Bayers - drums
Stuart Duncan - fiddle
Paul Franklin - steel guitar
Sammy Kershaw - lead vocals
Brent Mason - electric guitar
Hargus "Pig" Robbins - keyboards
John Wesley Ryles - background vocals
Joe Spivey - fiddle
John D. Willis - acoustic guitar
Glenn Worf - bass guitar

Charts

Weekly charts

Year-end charts

References

Allmusic (see infobox)

1997 albums
Sammy Kershaw albums
Mercury Nashville albums
Albums produced by Keith Stegall